Tad (also Romanized as Ţād and Tād) is a village in Bazarjan Rural District, in the Central District of Tafresh County, Markazi Province, Iran. At the 2006 census, its population was 89, in 32 families.

References 

Populated places in Tafresh County